Curro Savoy or Kurt Savoy (born Francisco Rodríguez, Andújar, Jaén Province, 1948) is a Spanish musician specialised in whistling who lives currently in France.

He started his professional career in 1959 in Madrid when Tico Medina and Yale presented him in a TV show. He later recorded a record with Saef Cetra and took part in several radio programmes.

He is mainly popular thanks to Ennio Morricone and the original soundtracks of A Fistful of Dollars and The Good, the Bad and the Ugly.

External links
 Official website
 

1948 births
Living people
People from Andújar
Spanish musicians
Whistlers